Lindsay Warren Carson (born November 21, 1960) is a Canadian former professional ice hockey centre who played seven seasons in the National Hockey League (NHL) with the Philadelphia Flyers and Hartford Whalers. Carson was born in Oxbow, Saskatchewan, but grew up in North Battleford, Saskatchewan.

Playing career
Carson started his NHL career with the Philadelphia Flyers in 1981. He also played for the Hartford Whalers. He left the NHL after the 1988 season. He played one more season in the AHL before retiring from hockey.

Career statistics

Regular season and playoffs

Personal life
Carson likes to go hunting and fishing.  Some of his favorite places have included North Glaslyn, Saskatchewan, Jasper National Park, Billings, Montana, and Portland, Maine.

References

External links
 

1960 births
Living people
Billings Bighorns players
Binghamton Whalers players
Canadian ice hockey centres
Hartford Whalers players
Sportspeople from North Battleford
Maine Mariners players
People from Oxbow, Saskatchewan
Philadelphia Flyers draft picks
Philadelphia Flyers players
Saginaw Gears players
Saskatoon Blades players
Springfield Indians players
Ice hockey people from Saskatchewan